Albin de la Simone (born in Amiens, Picardy, France on 14 December 1970) is a French singer-songwriter.

He has released five albums since 2003, being nominated to the 2018 Victoires de la Musique in the Best Song Album (Meilleur album de chansons) category and in 2014 in the Best Live Newcomers (Révélation scène) category.

He has been working in music since the mid-1990s as a keyboardist, bassist, arranger, and director for a large number of artists, including Miossec, Vanessa Paradis, Keren Ann, Arthur H, Alain Souchon, Raphaël Haroche, Mathieu Boogaerts, Jean-Louis Aubert, and Salif Keita, among others (complete discography below).

As an artist, his musical works are exhibited at Les Francofolies de La Rochelle, Philharmonie de Paris, and many other galleries and festivals.

He is also associated with the Théâtre National de Bretagne.

Career

Startings 

Between 1995 and 2000, he toured in Africa with Salif Keita and Angélique Kidjo, and he began to feature on other French singers' tracks.

Parallelly, de la Simone met the new singers of his generation (Mathieu Boogaerts, Matthieu Chedid, Arthur H, Nina Morato...) and found his calling. He wrote his first songs towards the end of the 1990s.

2003–2004: First album 
In 2003, de la Simone performed his first concerts as singer in Japan, opening for Mathieu Boogaerts.

In September, he released Albin de la Simone, his first album, on the label Virgin Records, co-directed with Renaud Letang. Of the album, "Elle aime", sung as a duet with Feist, and "Patricia," with Alain Souchon, became hits.

He composed in part the soundtrack of the film Tiresia, directed by Bertrand Bonello.

Discography

Albums

Decorations 
 Chevalier of the Order of Arts and Letters (2015)

References

External links
Official website (French)

1979 births
Living people
French singer-songwriters
People from Amiens
Chevaliers of the Ordre des Arts et des Lettres
21st-century French singers